Romola Butalia is an Indian writer, a journalist and a website editor. She was born in Kolkata. Her many passions in life have included travel, people, writing, communication and the Himalayas. She teaches Yoga and Vedic Sciences and is a practitioner in the tradition of the Himalyan yogis

Education
She completed school at Loreto House, Kolkata, graduated with honours in economics from Miranda House and did a Masters degree at Delhi School of Economics, University of Delhi.

Career
As a freelance journalist, she has written for major Indian newspapers and magazines including The Times of India, The Economic Times, The Independent, Gentleman, The Observer and Pioneer.  With the advent of satellite TV in India, she has produced an arts-based serial, directed a serial on women's issues, and has conducted interviews for Star Movies. She has edited India Travelogue, one of IndiaWorld's 13 websites which were bought by Satyam Infoway. She was later Editor of Myindia.com. She has served as portals head for 123India.com. She is the editor of India Travelogue. She currently stays in central rural Uttarakhand.

Bibliography
Butalia R In the Presence of the Masters MLBD, Delhi 2003 ,
Butalia R Sri Babaji: Immortal Yogi of the Himalayas MLBD, Delhi 2007.

References

Living people
Indian women journalists
Indian travel writers
Indian spiritual writers
Indian women travel writers
Year of birth missing (living people)